Pat Gerber (17 March 1934 in Glasgow – 26 August 2006 in Glasgow) was a Scottish writer and author mainly known for her children's books.

She wrote several children books, including: Volume of Clowns: Children's Poems on the Circus (1990), The Ghost of Glenmellish (2001), Stranger on the River (2002),  and To Catch a Thief (2003).

She also wrote a fiction book, Adventures on Cairngorm (2002) and two adult books: Maiden Voyage: Explorations (1992) and Search for the Stone of Destiny (1997).

She was the writer of a travel guide to Scotland, called Outdoors Scotland (2000), as well.

References 

 

1934 births
2006 deaths
British women travel writers
Scottish children's writers
Scottish travel writers
British women children's writers
Scottish women writers